The Medical Research Council (MRC) London Institute of Medical Sciences (LMS) (formerly MRC Clinical Sciences Centre) is a biomedical research institute based in West London, UK. Research at the institute focuses on the understanding of the molecular and physiological basis of health and disease. The LMS was established in 1994 and receives core funding from the Medical Research Council like the Laboratory of Molecular Biology at Cambridge University. The institute is hosted by Imperial College London at the Hammersmith Hospital., and is  part of the Institute of Clinical Sciences (ICS), a department in the Imperial College London, Faculty of Medicine. It has been led by Amanda Fisher since 2008.

Research 
There are three research sections at the LMS: Epigenetics, Genes and Metabolism and Quantitative Biology. Strengths in these areas provide opportunities for scientific discovery with an application to healthcare.

The institute's core research is funded by the Medical Research Council but researchers also receive funding from other sources, such as the European Research Council. In 2018 Professor Irene Miguel-Aliaga was awarded an ERC Advanced grant for her research on Sex differences in intestinal plasticity.

Building 
The LMS is based across a number of buildings at the Hammersmith Hospital campus in West London, UK. In 2017 a design team were appointed composed of Hawkins\Brown, Buro Happold and Abell Nepp to develop a  new home for the London Institute of Medical Sciences. In August 2018 contractors were invited to bid for the construction of the building. In November a planning application was submitted to the London Borough of Hammersmith and Fulham. The new building will be based at the Hammersmith Hospital campus on the former cyclotron site, which was decommissioned and demolished in 2014.

References 

1994 establishments in England
Buildings and structures in the London Borough of Hammersmith and Fulham
Health in the London Borough of Hammersmith and Fulham
Organisations based in the London Borough of Hammersmith and Fulham
Medical and health organisations based in London
Medical Research Council (United Kingdom)
Research institutes established in 1994
Research institutes in London